Resarö is an island in the Stockholm archipelago and a locality in Vaxholm Municipality, Stockholm County, Sweden. It had 2,946 inhabitants in 2010. Resarö includes the hamlet of Ytterby, famous for the discovery of several rare-earth elements in a local mine.

The name

The old form of the name was Risarna. The first element is ris 'brushwood' - the last element is derived from arin 'gravel; island made by gravel'. The last element ö 'island' was added in the 16th century.

References 

Islands of the Stockholm archipelago
Islands of Vaxholm Municipality
Populated places in Vaxholm Municipality